758 Boyz Sports Club are a Maartener association football club based in Philipsburg, Sint Maarten. The club competes in the SMSA Senior League, the top tier of football in Sint Maarten.

External links 
 

Football clubs in Sint Maarten
Association football clubs established in 2017
2017 establishments in Sint Maarten